Braulio is a given name.

Braulio Estima, a Brazilian jiu-jitsu practitioner and mixed martial artist
Braulio García, a Spanish singer-songwriter who is often credited as "Braulio".
Braulio Guerra, Mexican politician
Braulio Mari, a Spanish singer-songwriter.
Braulio Nóbrega, a Spanish football player.
Braulio of Zaragoza, a Bishop of Zaragoza.
Braulio is a liqueur from Valtellina, Italy.
Bráulio (footballer) (born 1948), Bráulio Barbosa de Lima, Brazilian football midfielder
Braulio Luna, a Mexican football player.

Spanish masculine given names